Eudes II of Ham (died 26 September 1234), Lord of Ham, was the eldest son of Lancelin of Ham, brother of Eudes' predecessor, Gérard, Lord of Ham.

Eudes took part at the Siege of Adrianople (1205). 
After returning to Ham, he rebuilt the Castle of Ham in stones.

Family 
He married Isabelle de Bethancourt, daughter of Raoul de Bethancourt. Their children were:

 Eudes III, Lord of Ham
 Gauthier

References 

Medieval French nobility
1234 deaths
Year of birth unknown